The Peel Sessions 1979–1981 is a compilation album collecting the first four sessions recorded by the English post-punk band Killing Joke for the legendary BBC Radio 1 DJ John Peel, plus a session recorded for his colleague Richard Skinner's programme. The sessions had been previously available as bootlegs, but are presented here in pristine sound quality.

Track listing
 "Pssyche" – 4:58
 "Wardance" – 3:45
 "Nuclear Boy" – 3:06
 "Malicious Boogie" – 2:02
Tracks 1-4: Peel Session recorded on 17 October 1979
 "Change" – 4:20
 "Tomorrow's World" – 4:54
 "Complication" – 3:22
Tracks 5-7: Peel Session recorded on 5 March 1980
 "Fall of Because" – 4:16
 "Tension" – 3:33
 "Butcher" – 4:36
Tracks 8-10: Peel Session recorded on 27 April 1981 
 "Hum" – 4:44
 "Empire Song" – 3:24
 "We Have Joy" – 2:52
 "Chop Chop" – 4:46
Tracks 11-14: Peel Session recorded on 16 December 1981
 "Tension" – 4:13
 "Unspeakable" – 4:45
 "Exit" – 2:52
Tracks 15-17: Skinner Session recorded on 29 May 1981

Personnel
Killing Joke
Jaz Coleman - vocals, keyboards
Kevin "Geordie" Walker - guitar
Martin "Youth" Glover - bass guitar
Paul Ferguson - drums

References

BBC Radio recordings
Peel Sessions recordings
Killing Joke live albums
2008 live albums
2008 compilation albums